Pahl may refer to:

People
Greg Pahl (born 1946), American journalist, author and energy activist
Hans-Heinrich Pahl (born 1960), German soccer player and manager
Jürgen Pahl (born 1956), German soccer goalkeeper
Kate Pahl (born 1962), British linguist
Milt Pahl (born 1943), Canadian politician and businessman
Ray Pahl (1935–2011), British sociologist
Vernon Pahl (born 1957), Canadian football player
Pahl Davis (1897–1943), American football player

Locations
Henry Pahl House, a listed building in Davenport, Iowa, U.S.
PAHL, the ICAO identifier of Huslia Airport

See also 
Pähl, a municipality in Bavaria, Germany
Pahlen, a municipality in Schleswig-Holstein, Germany
Pahlen, a noble family of Baltic German origin
Surnames from given names